Moran Mor Ignatius Jacob (Yaʿqub) III  (October 12, 1913 – June 26, 1980) was the 121st Syriac Orthodox Patriarch of Antioch and head of the Syriac Orthodox Church 1957-1980. He was skilled in and knowledgeable in Syriac sacral music or Beth Gazo. He re-established the Maphrianate/Catholicate in the Jacobite Syrian Christian Church (the Indian Church).

Birth 

Mor Ignatius Yaʿqub III was born on October 12, 1913, in the Touma Mari family of Bartalla village in Iraq.

Ordinations 

He was ordained deacon by Patriarch Ignatius Elias III and priest by Patriarch Ignatius Afram I Barsoum. He visited the Syriac Orthodox Church in Kerala, India, in 1933 as Rabban ʿAbdel Ahad where he served as a malphono (teacher) at the Mor Ignatios Dayro. In 1946, he returned to the Middle East to teach at the Mor Ephrem Seminary in Mosul and was ordained Metropolitan of Beirut and Damascus in 1950. In 1957, he was consecrated Patriarch after Patriarch Ignatius Afram I Barsoum died.

Church in India 

Patriarch Yaʿqub worked actively for cooperation among the Oriental Orthodox Churches and the reconciliation of the Church in India. In 1964, he visited Malankara and consecrated Augen Timotheous as Catholicos to establish peace in the church.

Books 

Patriarch Yaʿqub wrote at least thirty books about the history of the Church, spirituality and liturgy including a History of the Church until the 6th century, a History of the Syrian Church in India, a comparative study of Syriac and Arabic languages, and Personageaphies of  Ephrem the Syrian, Philoxenus of Mabbug, and Yaʿqub of Serugh. Students of the church consider his lecture as an authoritative on the Syrian Orthodox Church at the University of Göttingen in 1971.

Syriac music 

Patriarch Yaʿqub was skilled in and knowledgeable about Syriac music. He was endowed with a sharp memory that enabled him to memorize over 700 melodies of the Beth Gazo including variants (Shuhlophe). He had a voice of a "nightingale" as Patriarch Ignatius Zakka I Iwas tells us. He learned the Beth Gazo from another master of Syriac music, Mor Yulios Elias Qoro, then Patriarchal Delegate in India.

He was familiar with his native school of music in Iraq (the School of Takrit) as well as the more popular School of Mardin. During a five-month visit to the United States (from March 11 - August 15, 1960), Yaʿqub, at the request of Metropolitan Mor Athanasius Yeshuʿ Samuel, the archbishop of the United States and Canada, recorded the Beth Gazo according to the School of Mardin. This recording serves as the authoritative reference to the musical tradition of the School of Mardin. Patriarch Yaʿqub is remembered for his spiritually uplifting celebration of the liturgy. He encouraged many to accept the simple way of life. After he consecrated sacred myron in the Mor Gabriel monastery in 1964, myron flowed from the glass container the following day and people were healed by it.

Death 

Patriarch Yaʿqub died on June 26, 1980, and was buried in Saint George's Patriarchal Cathedral, Damascus, Syria.

See also

Syriac Orthodox Church
List of Syriac Orthodox Patriarchs of Antioch - list from 1783
Malankara Jacobite Syriac Orthodox Church
The Malankara Orthodox Syrian Church
Ignatius Zakka I Iwas
Ignatius Afram I Barsoum
Ignatius Elias III

References

External links
 Biography from Margonitho: Syriac Orthodox Resources
 Syriac Orthodox Church

1913 births
1980 deaths
Syrian Oriental Orthodox Christians
Syriac Orthodox Patriarchs of Antioch
Syriac writers
Syrian archbishops
20th-century Oriental Orthodox archbishops
Assyrians from the Ottoman Empire
Iraqi Assyrian people